Challapata Airport  is a high-elevation airport serving the city of Challapata in the Oruro Department of Bolivia.

There is mountainous terrain nearby to the east.

See also

Transport in Bolivia
List of airports in Bolivia

References

External links
OurAirports - Collpani
Fallingrain - Collpani Airport

Airports in Oruro Department